Stagetillus is a monotypic genus of Southeast Asian jumping spiders containing the single species, Stagetillus opaciceps. It was first described by Eugène Louis Simon in 1885, and is found only in Indonesia and Malaysia.

The carapace is a shiny yellowish-red with two dark stripes on the sides. The very narrow, long abdomen is dark purplish with elongated white marks on the sides and a transverse white mark near the spinnerets. The legs are yellow, except for the very robust front pair, which is dark with yellow tarsi.

References

External links
 Diagnostic drawings of S. opaciceps and S. semiostrinus

Monotypic Salticidae genera
Salticidae
Spiders of Asia